Khalid bin Omar bin Said al Marhoon is an Omanis politician and governor of Muscat. He is the Minister of Civil Service in the Sultanate of Oman.

References 

Living people
Government ministers of Oman
Omani Muslims
Year of birth missing (living people)